Kapaleeshwarar Temple is a Hindu temple dedicated to lord Shiva located in Mylapore, Chennai in the Indian state of Tamil Nadu. The form of Shiva's consort Parvati worshipped at this temple is called Karpagambal is from Tamil ("Goddess of the Wish-Yielding Tree"). The temple was built around the 7th century CE and is an example of Dravidian architecture.

According to the Puranas, Shakti worshipped Shiva in the form of a peacock, giving the vernacular name Mylai to the area that developed around the temple – mayil is Tamil for "peacock". Shiva is worshiped as Kapaleeswarar, and is represented by the lingam. His consort Parvati is depicted as Karpagambal. The presiding deity is revered in the 7th-century Tamil Saiva canonical work, the Tevaram, written by Tamil saint poets known as the Nayanars and classified as Paadal Petra Sthalam.

The temple has numerous shrines, with those of Kapaleeswarar and Karpagambal being the most prominent. The temple complex houses many halls. The temple has six daily rituals at various times from 5:30 a.m. to 10 p.m., and four yearly festivals on its calendar. The Arubathimoovar festival celebrated during the Tamil month of Panguni as part of the ப்ரஹ்மோத்சவம் is the most prominent festival in the temple.

The temple is maintained and administered by the Hindu Religious and Charitable Endowments Department of the Government of Tamil Nadu.

Legend 

The temple's name is derived from the words kapāla (head) and Īśvara an alias of lord Shiva. According to the Puranas, during the meeting of Brahma and Shiva at top of Mount Kailash Brahma failed to show the due respect to Shiva. Due to this, Shiva plucked off one of Brahma's heads (kapalams). In an act of penance, Brahma came down to the site of Mylapore and installed a Lingam to please Shiva. This place is known as Sukra Puri, Veda Puri, among many other names including "Kailaye Mayilai and Mayilaye Kayilai "which means this place is equal to kailash. Goddess Karpagambal, a form of Shiva's consort Parvati, due to a curse became a pea-hen and did penance here to get back her original personality. Shiva's son Murugan received the spear (Sakthi Vel) for the destruction of a demon from Parvati here. Brahma had worshipped here to get rid of his ego and get back his power to create. The four Vedas have worshipped here. Sukracharya worshipped the Lord here and got back his lost eye. Rama has worshipped here and won the war against Ravana and brought back Sita from Lanka. The daughter of Sivanesa Chettiar Angam Poompavai got her lost life due to snake bite was later resurrected here by the powers of Thirugnana Sambandar. Vayilar Nayanar, a saiva saint, attained salvation here and Mylapore is also the birth place of Thiruvalluvar who wrote the Thirukkural. In Thevaram special mention is made about the beautiful Madaveedhi as "Malgun Mathri Thavazhum Maada Veedhi Mylappil Ullar". Thiruganana Sambandar, Arunagirinathar have sung the glory of Karpagambal, Singara Velar. The 10-day festival during March / April is a treat to watch and Arubathu Moovar festival is attended by lakhs of devotees every year.

History 

The commonly held view is that the temple was built in the 7th century CE by the ruling Pallavas. This view is based on references to the temple in the hymns of the Nayanars (which, however, place it by a sea shore). Thirugnanasambandar's 6th song in Poompavaipathikam and Arunagirinathar's 697th song in Thirumylai Thirupugazh, make clear reference to the Kapaleeswarar temple being located by a seashore. There are inscriptions dating back to 12th century inside the temple. The temple's 120 ft gopuram (gateway tower) was built during 1906 with stucco figures adorning it. The temple is maintained and administered by the Hindu Religious and Endowment Board of the Government of Tamil Nadu.

The Temple

The Kapaleeshwarar temple is of typical Dravidian architectural style, with the gopuram overpowering the street on which the temple sits. This temple is also a testimonial for the vishwakarmas sthapathis. There are two entrances to the temple marked by the gopuram on either side. The east gopuram is about 40 m high, while the smaller western gopuram faces the sacred tank.

The vahanas (Sanskrit for "vehicles") at the temple include the bull, Adhikaranandi, elephant, bandicoot, peacock, goat and parrot, while a golden chariot is a recent addition. Statues of the god and the goddess are seated on a vahana or chariot which is brought in a procession around the temple while the temple band plays music. Devotees gather around the vahanas and consider it a privilege to pull / lift the God and the Goddess on the vahana. There is also a peacock and a peahen caged inside the temple, to symbolize the tradition that Karpagambal had come in the form of peahen to plead to Kapaleeshwarar.

Sapta Sthana Shiva temples
This temple is one of the Sapta Sthana Shiva temples in Mylapore area. (one of the seven sacred Shiva temples in Mylapore). They are:

 Karaneeswarar Temple
 Tirttapaleeswarar Temple
 Velleeswarar Temple
 Virupakshiswarar Temple
 Valeeswarar Temple
 Malleeswarar Temple
 Kapaleeshwarar Temple

In addition to these "Sapta Sthana Shiva sthalas", the Ekambareshwarar–Valluvar temple in the neighbourhood is traditionally considered the indispensable eighth.

The tank
The theppakulam or the temple tank lies to the west of the temple. Also known as the Kapaleeshwarar Tank or the Mylapore Tank, it is one of the oldest and well-maintained theppakulams in the city, measuring about 190 m in length and 143 m in breadth. The tank has a storage capacity of 119,000 cubic metre and has water all through the year. The 16-pillared, granite-roofed structure, known as the mandapam at the centre of this tank is known for its significance during the three-day annual float festival, when idols of Lord Kapaleeshwarar and other deities are taken around the tank to the chanting of Vedic hymns.

In 2014,  56.5 million was allotted to build a 2,150-meter-long pavement around the tank.

Religious practises
The temple priests perform the pooja (rituals) during festivals and on a daily basis. Like other Shiva temples of Tamil Nadu, the priests belong to the Shaivaite community. The temple rituals are performed six times a day; Ushathkalam at 6:00 a.m., Kalasanthi at 9:00 a.m., Uchikalam at 1:00 p.m., Sayarakshai at 5:00 p.m., Irandamkalam at 7:00 p.m. and Ardha Jamam at 9:00 p.m. There is a separate calendar for the Rahu Abhishekam (sacred ablution): it is performed twice in a day at 11:30 a.m and 5:30 p.m. and additionally twice at various times in the day. Each ritual comprises four steps: abhisheka (sacred bath), alangaram (decoration), neivethanam (food offering) and deepa aradanai (waving of lamps) for both Kapaleeswarar and Karpagambal. The worship is held amidst music with nagaswaram (pipe instrument) and tavil (percussion instrument), religious instructions in the Vedas (sacred text) read by priests and prostration by worshippers in front of the temple mast. During Friday worship, the statue of the goddess Karpagambal is decorated with a kaasu maala, a garland made of gold coins.

Festivals

During the Tamil month of Panguni, the traditional brahmotsavam (annual festival) takes place when the entire neighborhood comes alive with a mela (carnival)-like atmosphere. Since this month corresponds to the mid-March to mid-April duration, the Kapaleeshwarar temple celebrates the nine day-long as Panguni Peruvizha (Spring festival). The festival starts with Dwajarohanam (flag hoisting), includes the therotsavam,  (Tamil, ther, "car/chariot"; utsavam, "festival"), Arupathimoovar festival and concludes with the Tirukkalyanam (Marriage of Kapaleeswarar & Karpagambal). In Brahmotsavam, the idols of Kapaleeshwarar and Karpagambal are decorated with clothes and jewels, are mounted on a vahana, and then taken around the temple and its water tank in a pradakshinam (a clockwise path when seen from above). This is repeated with different vahanas over the next nine days. The more important of the individual pradakshinams are the Athigara Nandhi on the third day, the Rishaba Vahanam on the midnight of the fifth day, the ther (about 13 meters in height and pulled by people) on the seventh morning, and the Arupathimoovar festival on the eighth day.

The Arupathimoovar festival is the most important procession. It is named after the sixty-three Nayanmars who have attained salvation by their love & devotion to the all-compassionate Lord Shiva. All sixty-three Nayanmar idols follow the Kapaleeshwarar idol on this procession. During the car festival, Kapaleeshwarar is depicted holding a bow while seated on a throne, with his wife Karpagambal alongside. Brahma is depicted riding the ther. The chariot is decorated with flowers and statues, and there are huge gatherings of devotees to pull the ther. The car festival of 1968 is documented in the documentary film Phantom India by Louis Malle.

Religious work and saints

There is a reference to the temple in Sangam literature of the 1st to 5th centuries and the earliest post-Sangam mention is found in the 6th century Tamil literature. The temple and the deity were immortalized in Tamil poetry in the works of Tevaram by poet saint belonging to the 7th century – Thirugnana Sambanthar has composed the 6th Poompavai pathigam in praise of the temple. Arunagirinathar, a 15th-century poet, sings praise of the temple in Tirumayilai Tirupugazh. The 12th-century poet Gunaveera Pandithar sings about Neminathan under Theerthangar neminathar pugazh. Tirumayilai Prabanthangal is a compilation of four works on the temple and the deity.

See also
 Heritage structures in Chennai

Notes

References

  Alt URL

See also
 Parthasarathy Temple
 Religion in Chennai

External links

Temple Information
 Festivals of Mylapore
Kapaleeswarar Temple Timings

Padal Petra Stalam
Hindu temples in Chennai
Shiva temples in Tamil Nadu